Swapnote, known as Nintendo Letter Box in PAL regions and  in Japan, is a messaging application for the Nintendo 3DS family. Swapnote was released on December 21, 2011, in Japan and December 22, 2011, in Europe, Australia and North America via the Nintendo eShop. It can be downloaded at no additional cost and is pre-installed on newer systems. Swapnote is the successor to the PictoChat app for the Nintendo DS line.

In November 2016, Nintendo released a successor called Swapdoodle.

Features 

Swapnote allows users to send hand-written/drawn messages to either registered friends online via SpotPass or other users locally via StreetPass. The app also allows users to freely embed pictures and sounds into their messages, and change the position and the orientation of the picture and sound icons. Features are unlocked as players continue to send letters, such as the ability to hand-write/draw 3D messages, with additional stationery and features unlocked by spending Play Coins. Additional stationery can be obtained via certain Nintendo related events, such as using specific software, or by saving them from other people's messages.

Updates 
On July 5, 2012, Nintendo updated the Swapnote application to feature six different colors of ink, with only one color being available per message. On April 11, 2013, Nintendo updated Swapnote yet again, including the ability to take photos or record audio directly through the application, as well as the ability to undo drawings, and use different colors on each page of a message.

On December 15, 2020, Nintendo of America released a software update titled "Swapnote Remastered" with instructions on how to perform the update on their support website. This was then documented on Nintendo of Korea's support website as well on December 16.

Discontinuation 
On October 31, 2013, Nintendo abruptly suspended SpotPass functionality of Swapnote, presumably after an incident in Japan where minors were sharing Friend Codes with people who had exploited the messaging service to allegedly exchange pornographic imagery. The application has since been delisted from the Nintendo eShop. Additionally, the Special Notes service, which were also sent via SpotPass to promote Nintendo games, has also been suspended. Nintendo issued an apology to those who had been using the application in a responsible manner.

Nikki 

A unique, female Mii character known as Nikki acts as the software's hostess and mascot. By standard, Nikki is featured in the tutorial messages that appear when users start-up and use the app over time. Prior to the SpotPass suspension, several Special Notifications sent from Nintendo based on special occasions featured Nikki announcing such occasions, such as Valentine's Day, and these notification messages often came with new non-game-based stationery and AR pictures of Nikki. Nikki's official Mii would also automatically appear in the StreetPass Mii Plaza when these messages were opened. Nikki's name is based on the app's Japanese title, which features the term , which literally means "diary" in Japanese. As a character, however, Nikki's Japanese name is written in Kana characters instead of Kanji.

Due to the character's popularity, Nintendo had released another Nintendo 3DS app featuring Nikki called , although the app was exclusively available to members of the Japanese Club Nintendo rewards program. After the discontinuation of Club Nintendo in Japan on September 30, 2015, the app is no longer redeemable. A Nintendo 3DS HOME Menu theme based on Swapnote called "Swapnote: Nikki and Friends" was released in Japan and North America. Nikki badges would occasionally become available in the Nintendo Badge Arcade app for Nintendo 3DS as part of the "Nikki & Friends" set. The app's host, Arcade Bunny, often expresses his infatuation towards Nikki. Nintendo of America originally used Nikki's physical appearance as a Mii Fighter to market Super Smash Bros. for Nintendo 3DS and Wii U. Nikki is included in the Wii U version of Super Mario Maker as an unlockable "8-bit" costume. Nikki returns as a host in Swapnote's successor, Swapdoodle. Nikki appears as an assist trophy in Super Smash Bros. Ultimate.

Swapdoodle
Swapdoodle ( in Japan), the successor to Swapnote, was released as a free-to-start downloadable title in North America and Europe on November 17, 2016. The series retains several features from the original Swapnote, with the exception of photo and sound attachments, while adding new features including Doodle Lessons, stamps, secret pages. The application can be expanded with purchasable downloadable content, which adds new pen colors, stationery, note capacity and lessons.

Reception 

Despite being a successor to PictoChat, Swapnote's messaging model is not based on the standard instant messaging model as PictoChat had been, as the application lacks instant messaging features such as keyboard functionality, chat rooms, and live-continuous messaging.

Footnotes

References 

2011 video games
Art games
Nintendo 3DS eShop games
Nintendo 3DS-only games
Nintendo Network
Nintendo 3DS games
Nintendo games
Video games developed in Japan
Video games scored by Kenji Yamamoto (composer, born 1964)

ca:Nintendo Network#Nintendo Letter Box